Minnesota State Highway 96 (MN 96) is a  highway in Minnesota that runs from its intersection with U.S. Highway 61 in White Bear Lake and continues east to its eastern terminus at its intersection with State Highway 95 on the northern edge of Stillwater.

It is also known as Dellwood Road in the communities of Dellwood, Grant, and Stillwater Township.  The route is also known briefly as Lake Avenue North within the city of White Bear Lake.

Many people in the area still think of Highway 96 in two sections: 1) this eastern portion that remains a State Highway and 2) the western portion that is now known as Ramsey County Highway 96. The two portions were never aligned, but were always about a mile apart, with the western portion about a mile south of the eastern portion.

Route description
State Highway 96 serves as an east–west arterial route between the communities of White Bear Lake, Dellwood, Grant, Stillwater Township, and Stillwater.

The route is legally defined as Legislative Route 96 in the Minnesota Statutes.

History
Highway 96 was authorized in 1933. It was paved east of U.S. 61 at the time the highway was marked. The part of the highway between U.S. 8 and U.S. 61 was completely paved by 1935.

From 1934 to 1994, State Highway 96 included the western portion that is now known as Ramsey County Highway 96., which extended farther west several miles through the communities of Vadnais Heights, Shoreview, and Arden Hills.  The former western terminus for State Highway 96 during this time period was at its intersection with old U.S. Highway 8 (near I-35W) on the Arden Hills / New Brighton border.  This section of Highway 96 was once part of the Highway 100 Beltway circling the entire Twin Cities during the 1940s and 1950s.

The western portion of Highway 96 between Highway 61 at White Bear Lake and Old Highway 8 at Arden Hills is now known as Ramsey County Highway 96.

A few people in the area still remember stories of how the western portion of Highway 96 was first built across the south arm of Birch Lake the 1930s in White Bear Township. Most now only see that part of the lake as a pond to the south and a marshland to the north, but that's the result of major landfill projects that began in the 1930s and continued in road-widening projects through the 1990s. Local farmer and machinist Con Heckel told of more than one 1930s construction company that went out of business in the process. The old roads had gone around the lakes, but the new ones like Highway 96 were built straight over them.

The 2021 Minnesota Legislature authorized removal of the section east of Highway 244, to become effective when a turnback agreement is reached with Washington County.

State Highway 96 is a turnback candidate because it is a minor arterial, which functions more as a county state-aid highway or county road.

Major intersections

References

096
Transportation in Ramsey County, Minnesota
Transportation in Washington County, Minnesota